A scribe is a person who writes documents by hand.

Scribe may also refer to:

People
 Eugène Scribe, a French dramatist

Roles or occupations
 Scribe (ER), an emergency room employee
 Scribing (cartography), producing linework for maps

Musicians
 Scribe (rapper), a New Zealand rap/hip-hop artist
 Scribe (band), a hardcore/metal band from Mumbai, India

Organizations
 Scribe (publisher), a publishing house in Australia founded in 1976
 Scribes: The American Society of Legal Writers

Crafts
 Scribing (joinery) a woodwork joining technique
 Wood scribe, a tool made for marking wood
 Scribing (graffiti), an artistic technique
 Scribing, used to control fractures in silicon wafer dicing or a glass cutter

IT-related
 Scribe (markup language), a markup language and word processing system
 Scribe Software (disambiguation)
 Scribe (log server), an open source server for aggregating log data
 Scribe, the Unicode rendering part of the Qt toolkit user interface library
 Scribes (software), a GNOME text editor
 The Apple Scribe Printer, a peripheral for the Apple IIc computer

Websites
 Scribd, a document-sharing website

Animals
 Habrosyne scripta, a moth of North America